Kerri Ann Laing (born 17 October 1968) is a South African former cricketer who played as a right-handed batter and right-arm off break bowler. She appeared in one Test match and 23 One Day Internationals for South Africa between 1997 and 2002. She played domestic cricket for Gauteng.

References

External links
 
 

1968 births
Living people
Cricketers from Durban
South African women cricketers
South Africa women Test cricketers
South Africa women One Day International cricketers
Central Gauteng women cricketers
20th-century South African women
21st-century South African women